George Balloch Harford (1902–unknown) was an English footballer who played in the Football League for Carlisle United, Luton Town and Millwall.

References

1902 births
English footballers
Association football goalkeepers
English Football League players
Erith & Belvedere F.C. players
Millwall F.C. players
Luton Town F.C. players
Carlisle United F.C. players
Rhyl F.C. players
1979 deaths